Enterprise is a modern bred, late-ripening and attractive, red cultivar of domesticated apple with excellent fruit quality combined with disease resistance to scab, cedar apple rust, fire blight and some resistance to powdery mildew. The fruit is large and attractive and retains excellent fresh quality for up to six months at 1°C. Its moderate acidity at time of harvest mellows in storage, and it is best after one month of storage.

Enterprise is the ninth apple cultivar to be developed by the PRI disease resistant apple breeding program and "PRI" is remarked in its name Enter"PRI"se. It has combined genetics of many selected breeds, including ancestry of McIntosh apple, Golden Delicious, Starking Delicious, Rome Beauty and the vf gene of Malus floribunda for scab resistance.

Fruit shape is usually somewhat elongated in shape, and lopsided in young trees. They are big in size, red flush over yellow, fading to orange.

The Cosmic Crisp apple, developed at Washington State University, is the offspring of the Enterprise apple and the Honeycrisp apple.

References

See also
List of apple cultivars

PRI cultivars